Sinkarappally (koduvila)is a small scenic ward situated between Ashtamudi Lake and Kallada River, on the outskirts of Kollam District in Kerala.

References

 Kerala Tourism Official Website

Villages in Kollam district